Millwood is an unincorporated community in Lincoln County, in the U.S. state of Missouri.

History
A post office called Millwood was established in 1842, and remained in operation until 1903. The community was named after William Millward, a congressman from Pennsylvania (a postal error accounts for the error in spelling, which was never corrected).

References

Unincorporated communities in Lincoln County, Missouri
Unincorporated communities in Missouri